The E. Clarke and Julia Arnold House is a Frank Lloyd Wright designed Usonian home in Columbus, Wisconsin, United States.

The Arnold house occupies a large site on the west edge of the city of Columbus and overlooks the farmlands to the west. It was built in 1955-1956 for E. Clarke Arnold, a successful Columbus attorney, his wife, Julia, and their growing family, from a design supplied by Frank Lloyd Wright. The Arnolds, like so many of Wright's clients, came to him for a house of their own after seeing a house he had designed for friends, in this case, for Patrick and Margaret Kinney, whose stone-clad Lancaster, Wisconsin house Wright designed in 1951.

This low one-story home is built of Wisconsin limestone, redwood board and batten, and glass. It is one of Wright's diamond module homes, a form he used in the Patrick and Margaret Kinney House, the Richard Smith House and a number of other homes he designed in the late 1940s and early 1950s. In this design, all the angles are either 60°or 120°, forming equilateral parallelogram modules having  sides. It was originally built with two wings set at 120° angles which gave the house a V-shaped plan with a living room wing, a bedroom wing, and a central core that contained the fireplace mass, kitchen, and utilities. This home featured a twist on the usual Usonian color scheme with Golden ocher floors instead of the signature "Cherokee Red."

Within three years of completion, the arrival of twins necessitated the construction of a second bedroom wing. Wright approved this wing in 1959 and the plans were in preparation when he died in April of that year. Wright apprentice and Taliesin Fellow John H. "Jack" Howe drafted a second, partly revised design, which established the final Y-shaped plan of the house.

References

Storrer, William Allin. The Frank Lloyd Wright Companion. University Of Chicago Press, 2006,  (S.374)

External links

All-Wright Site - Frank Lloyd Wright Building Guide - Wisconsin
Althouse: The E. Clarke and Julie Arnold House and the Richard C. and Berenice Smith House — by Frank Lloyd Wright
Arcaid - Image Detail E. Clarke Arnold House Columbus Wisconsin USA
Wright In Wisconsin - Wright And Like Tours
PrairieMod: Wright & Like 2008 Wrap-Up

Houses in Columbia County, Wisconsin
Frank Lloyd Wright buildings
Houses completed in 1956
Houses on the National Register of Historic Places in Wisconsin
Columbus, Wisconsin
National Register of Historic Places in Columbia County, Wisconsin